Superman is a 1987 Indian   Hindi-language superhero film produced and directed by B. Gupta. The film stars Dharmendra, Puneet Issar, Sonia Sahni and Ranjeeta Kaur. Puneet Issar plays the role of Superman. It is the Indian adaptation of 1978 American film of the same name.

Cast
Puneet Issar as Shekhar / Superman
 Sonia Sahni as Editor 
 Dharmendra as Jor-El, Superman's Biological Father
 Ranjeeta Kaur as Lara-El, Superman's Biological Mother
 Ashok Kumar as Jonathan Kent, Superman's Foster Father
 Birbal as Birbal Chamcha
 Bob Christo as Bob
 Preeti Ganguli. as Woman from Zambia
 Rajan Haksar as Goga
 Dinesh Hingoo as Rustom
 Jagdeep
 Jankidas
 Shakti Kapoor as Verma 
 Lalita Kumari as Mrs. Jankidas
 Guddi Maruti as Guddi Jhunjhunwali
 Murad as Chief of the other planet

Soundtrack
Kankari Jhade Paon Mein" - Anuradha Paudwal
"Maine Maana Tumhi Ho" - Anuradha Paudwal
"Puchho Na Kya Mujhe" - Chandrani Mukherjee
"Tujhe Paani Pila Ke Maarenge" - Chandrani Mukherjee, Shabbir Kumar
"Raat Ho To Aisi Ho Mastani" - Alka Yagnik

See also 

 Superman
 Superman in film
 Superman(1978 film)
 Superman II

References

External links

1987 films
1980s Hindi-language films
1980s Indian superhero films
Superman films
Indian remakes of American films
Indian superhero films
Unofficial Superman films
1980s American films